Jozef Baláži, also spelled Jozef Balázsy (2 November 1919 – 30 May 1998) was a Slovak former football player and manager.

He played for ŠK Bratislava and OAP Bratislava.

References

External links

1919 births
1998 deaths
Slovak football managers
Slovak footballers
ŠK Slovan Bratislava managers
ŠK Slovan Bratislava players
Slovakia international footballers
Czechoslovak footballers
Czechoslovakia international footballers
Dual internationalists (football)

Association football forwards